Audubon County Airport , formerly Audubon Municipal Airport, is a public airport located one mile (2 km) southeast of the central business district of Audubon, a city in Audubon County, Iowa, United States. It is owned by the Audubon County Airport Authority.

Although most U.S. airports use the same three-letter location identifier for the FAA and IATA, Audubon County Airport is assigned ADU by the FAA but has no designation from the IATA (which assigned ADU to Ardabil Airport in Ardabil, Iran).

Facilities and aircraft 
For the 12-month period ending September 28, 2005, the airport had 2,562 aircraft operations: 96% general aviation and 4% air taxi.

References

External links 

Airports in Iowa
Transportation buildings and structures in Audubon County, Iowa